Fermiite is a rare uranium mineral with the formula Na4(UO2)(SO4)3·3H2O. Chemically related minerals include oppenheimerite, meisserite (which is also structurally-related to fermiite), belakovskiite, natrozippeite and plášilite. Fermiite comes from the Blue Lizard mine, San Juan County, Utah, USA, which is known for many rare uranium minerals. The name honors Enrico Fermi (1901–1954).

Association
Fermiite is closely associated with numerous other sulfate minerals: oppenheimerite, bluelizardite, wetherillite, blödite, manganoblödite, chalcanthite, epsomite, gypsum, hexahydrite, kröhnkite, sideronatrite and tamarugite.

Crystal structure
The main building block of the crystal structure of fermiite is a chain of the composition (UO2)(SO4)3. Chains are connected with five types of Na-O polyhedra.

References

Uranium(VI) minerals
Sulfate minerals
Sodium minerals
Hydroxide minerals
Orthorhombic minerals
Minerals in space group 31